William, Willie, Will or Bill Kelly may refer to:

Arts and entertainment
Bill Kelly (writer), American screenwriter
William Kelly (artist), American artist
Roosevelt Sykes (1906–1983), American blues musician, stage name "Willie Kelly"

Politics
William Kelly (Alabama politician) (1786–1834), Alabama politician and U.S. senator
William Kelly (New York state senator) (1807–1872), New York politician
William W. J. Kelly (1814–1878), Lieutenant Governor of Florida
William Moore Kelly (1827–1888), businessman and politician in New Brunswick
William Kelly (New Zealand politician) (1840–1907), New Zealand Member of Parliament
William Kelly (Labour politician) (1874–1944), British Labour politician
William Kelly (New South Wales politician) (1875–1932), Australian politician
Willie Kelly (politician) (1877–1960), Australian politician
William Osmund Kelly (1909–1974), mayor of Flint, Michigan
William McDonough Kelly (1925–2013), political strategist and retired Canadian Senator
Bill Kelly (politician), politician in Lapeer, Michigan

Sports

American football
Bill Kelly (quarterback) (1905–1931), American football player at the University of Montana and in the NFL
Bill Kelly (American football, born 1947), American football player and coach
Kenneth Kelly (1905–1984), nicknamed "Bill", American football player and coach, head coach at Central Michigan University, 1951–1966

Australian rules football
Bill Kelly (footballer, born 1882) (1882–1961), Australian rules footballer for Fitzroy
Bill Kelly (footballer, born 1930) (born 1930), Australian rules footballer for Footscray
Will Kelly (Australian footballer) (born 2000), Australian rules footballer for Collingwood

Baseball
Bill Kelly (outfielder), 19th-century American baseball player
Bill Kelly (first baseman) (1898–1990), American baseball player
William Kelly (baseball), Negro league baseball player

Other sports
Bill Kelly (rugby league) (1892–1975), New Zealand rugby league footballer and coach
Will Kelly (rugby union) (born 1997), Canadian rugby union player
William Kelly (Victoria cricketer) (1875–1968), Australian cricketer
William Harvey Kelly (1883–1944), Australian cricketer
William Kelly (1910s footballer) (1890-1920), English footballer for Newcastle United and Manchester City, see List of Manchester City F.C. players (1–24 appearances)
William Kelly (footballer, born 1937), English footballer known as 'Brian'
Willie Kelly (footballer) (1922–1996), Scottish footballer for Airdrieonians and Blackburn Rovers

Others
William Kelly (biblical scholar) (1821–1906), classicist and Biblical expositor
William Kelly (inventor) (1811–1888), American inventor of a steel smelting process
William Russell Kelly, founder of the American temporary staffing agency, Kelly Services

See also
William Kelly's War, a 2014 film
William Kelley (disambiguation)